The 1947–48 California Golden Bears men's ice hockey season was the 18th season of play for the program but first under the oversight of the NCAA. The Bears represented the University of California, Berkeley and were coached by Julius Schroder.

Season
After a rather poor season, Cal got under way early with a game before Thanksgiving. While they lost the match, it did reveal the two best players on the team, Pat Finnegan and Ian Watson. Cal played sparingly over the succeeding month but were able to get in enough practice time to improve their play and earn their first victory in the rematch with the Olympic Club. A couple of weeks afterwards, the Bears stunned British Columbia to the tune of 6–2 with Finnegan's hat-trick leading the way.

With renewed optimism, the team welcomed a pair of midwestern colleges to the Pacific for a three-game slate over the winter break. Cal kept close in all of the games but lost each match despite their best efforts. Though the losses stung, the team could hang their hat on drawing 5,500 spectators to the game in Los Angeles. That plus the potential of UCLA returning to the ice gave hope that the Golden Bears program would be able to continue. While the future appeared rosy, the present was a bit murky. Cal's losing streak was extended with another loss to the Olympic Club. Just before the exam break, Cal lost another pair of games to the Olympics, dropping their record to 2–7.

During the break, the team went on a 6,000 mile journey to play several other college teams. Their first stop was in Colorado where they took on one of the strongest outfits that season, the Colorado College Tigers. Once more, Cal was able to keep the score close in the two-game series but ended up dropping both contests. A few days later the team was in New England and were finally able to end their losing streak with a win over Yale. Unfortunately, Ian Watson was injured in the game when a puck struck him in the face. He finished the match but was out for the following night's tilt against Dartmouth. His absence couldn't have come at a worse time as the Indians were the best team in the nation and throttled the Golden Bears 4–13 while the green's backup netminder manned the goal crease for Cal.

Watson was healthy enough to return for the game at Brown and Cal proved to be the superior species of Bruin as the Golden Bears swamped the Brunos 10–4. Cal then travelled to face Michigan on their return trip but they were woefully outmatched by the superb Wolverine squad. The Maize and Blue trounced Cal 2–11 in the first meeting while Watson's stellar play allowed the team to at least save face in the rematch. While the trip didn't turn out as they might have hoped, the five losses they suffered were all against teams that would make the NCAA tournament. Cal ended its season with a final game against the Olympic Club and produced their best effort to date. Their performance in the 15–6 win was perhaps too little too late but Cal had performed well in many of their games despite possessing far fewer players than their collegiate opponents.

Roster

Standings

Schedule and results

|-
!colspan=12 style=";" | Regular Season

References

California Golden Bears men's ice hockey seasons
California
California
California